The 2002 Tanzanian census was conducted in August 2002 by the National Bureau of Statistics (NBS) of the Government of Tanzania. This included a census of agriculture in the country providing important data about the economy.

References

External links
 2002 Tanzanian census data

Censuses by country
History of Tanzania
2002 in Tanzania
2002 censuses
Demographics of Tanzania